The 1930 Meuse Valley fog between December 1st and December 5th, killed 63 people in Belgium owing to a combination of industrial air pollution and a localized weather inversion.

The River Meuse flows from France through Belgium and the Netherlands before entering the North Sea. The area in the Meuse Valley where the incident occurred, between the cities of Huy and Liege and centered around the town of Engis, was densely populated and had 27 factories. These factories produced zinc, steel, fertilizer, and explosives, amongst many other products. This was added to by large numbers of coal and wood heaters burning due to unseasonably cold weather. There were several thousand cases of illness over the week and the sixty three deaths occurred at the same time, with the first death occurring on December 3rd. Fifty-six of the deaths were to the east of Engis.

The main symptom was dyspnea (shortness of breath) and the average age of those who died was 62, over a range of ages of 20 to 89 years. The youngest, a 20 year old woman named Louise Dammes, died walking home from a party and may have had undiagnosed asthma that contributed to her death.  Cattle in the area were also affected. Kaj Roholm, Danish scientist and the world's leading authority on fluorine, determined that it was the fluorine gas from the nearby factories that was the killer. The exact date of this disaster is unknown.
A statue and plaque commemorating those who died were inaugurated in Engis on 2 December 2000.

Due to a similar(albeit less severe) incident that occurred in a nearby valley in 1911 that killed off many cattle, many farmers in the Meuse Valley fled to the hillside during the first two days of the smog, reducing livestock casualties and likely saving the lives of several farmers as well.

See also
Smog
1939 St. Louis smog
1948 Donora smog (United States)
Great Smog of London
1966 New York City smog
2013 Harbin smog (China, 2013)
Smog in Delhi

References

External links
The Meuse Valley fog of 1930: an air pollution disaster.  The Lancet

Environment of Belgium
Smog events
1930 in the environment
1930 in Belgium
1930 natural disasters 
1930 disasters in Belgium 
Environmental disasters in Europe
December 1930 events
Fluorine